is a city located in the western portion of Tokyo Metropolis, Japan. , the city had an estimated population of 76,423 in 38,825 households, and a population density of 9,400 persons per km2. Approximately 41.9% of the city population is over 65 years in age.

Geography
Kunitachi is located in the Musashino Terrace of central Tokyo Metropolis. Kunitachi is known for its broad main avenue, Daigaku Dori (University Avenue). This cherry-tree-lined boulevard stretches from Kunitachi Station on the Chūō Main Line toward the banks of the Tama River.

Surrounding municipalities
Tokyo Metropolis
Fuchū
Kokubunji
Tachikawa
Hino

Climate
Kunitachi has a Humid subtropical climate (Köppen Cfa) characterized by warm summers and cool winters with light to no snowfall.  The average annual temperature in Kunitachi is 13.9 °C. The average annual rainfall is 1647 mm with September as the wettest month. The temperatures are highest on average in August, at around 25.4 °C, and lowest in January, at around 2.5 °C.

Demographics
Per Japanese census data, the population of Kunitachi has remained relatively constant for the past 40 years.

History 
Kunitachi lies along the historical Kōshū Kaidō, a route that connected Edo with Kofu in the province of Kai (present-day Yamanashi Prefecture). The area was noted for its abundant spring water. The villages of Ishida, Aoyagi and Yabo were created within Tama District of Kanagawa Prefecture during the establishment of the modern municipalities system on April 1, 1889. The district was transferred from Kanagawa to Tokyo in 1893. In the 1920, much of the land was obtained by Kojiro Tsutsumi, the founder of Seibu, who began large-scale development of a planned community, which he intended to become a university town modeled after Göttingen in Germany. The Tokyo University of Commerce (currently Hitotsubashi University) was relocated from central Tokyo to this location, and a train station was opened on Chūō Main Line in 1926. The station named "Kunitachi", taking one kanji from the names of the stations to either side, namely Kokubunji Station and Tachikawa Station. The three villages were merged to form Kunitachi town in 1951. Kunitachi was elevated to city status on January 1, 1967.

Government
Kunitachi has a mayor-council form of government with a directly elected mayor and a unicameral city council of 22 members. Kunitachi, together with Kokubunji,  contributes two members to the Tokyo Metropolitan Assembly. In terms of national politics, the city is part of Tokyo 21st district of the lower house of the Diet of Japan.

Economy
Kunitachi remains a university town, but is also increasing a commuter town for central Tokyo, with an estimated 25.1% of the population commuting to central Tokyo daily, per the 2015 census.

Education
Tertiary:
Hitotsubashi University.
The city was originally home to Kunitachi College of Music. The tertiary-level branch of the conservatory is now located far outside the city, but its attached high school and business affiliate, Kunitachi Gakki (Western Tokyo's largest community music center), remain in central Kunitachi.

The city has two public high schools operated by the Tokyo Metropolitan Government Board of Education.
 
 

Kunitachi has eight public elementary schools and three junior high schools operated by the city government.

Municipal junior high schools:
 Kunitachi No. 1 (国立第一中学校)
 Kunitachi No. 2 (国立第二中学校)
 Kunitachi No. 3 (国立第三中学校)

Municipal elementary schools:
 Kunitachi No. 1 (国立第一小学校)
 Kunitachi No. 2 (国立第二小学校)
 Kunitachi No. 3 (国立第三小学校)
 Kunitachi No. 4 (国立第四小学校)
 Kunitachi No. 5 (国立第五小学校)
 Kunitachi No. 6 (国立第六小学校)
 Kunitachi No. 7 (国立第七小学校)
 Kunitachi No. 8 (国立第八小学校)

There are also three private high schools. There are also three private elementary schools and one private junior high school.

Transportation

Railway
 JR East – Chūō Main Line
 
 JR East – Nambu Line
 -

Highway
   Chūō Expressway

Local attractions
 Yabo Tenman-gū, a Shinto shrine established in 903 AD

References

External links

Kunitachi City Official Website 

 
Cities in Tokyo
Western Tokyo